The Distinguished Service Medal (DSM) is a military decoration of the United States Army that is presented to soldiers who have distinguished themselves by exceptionally meritorious service to the government in a duty of great responsibility. The performance must be such as to merit recognition for service that is clearly exceptional. The exceptional performance of normal duty will not alone justify an award of this decoration.

The Army's Distinguished Service Medal is equivalent to the Naval Service's Navy Distinguished Service Medal, Air and Space Forces' Distinguished Service Medal, and the Coast Guard Distinguished Service Medal. Prior to the creation of the Air Force's Distinguished Service Medal in 1960, United States Air Force airmen were awarded the Army's Distinguished Service Medal.

Description
The Coat of Arms of the United States in Gold surrounded by a circle of Dark Blue enamel, 1 ½ inches in diameter, bearing the inscription "FOR DISTINGUISHED SERVICE MCMXVIII".
On the reverse is a scroll for the name of the recipient (which is to be engraved) upon a trophy of flags and weapons. The medal is suspended by a bar attached to the ribbon.

Ribbon
 Scarlet 67111;
 Ultramarine Blue 67118;
 White 67101;
 Ultramarine Blue;
 Scarlet.

Additional awards of the Distinguished Service Medal are denoted by oak leaf clusters.

Criteria
The Distinguished Service Medal is awarded to any person who, while serving in any capacity with the United States Army, has distinguished themselves by exceptionally meritorious service to the Government in a duty of great responsibility.

The performance must be such as to merit recognition for service which is clearly exceptional. Exceptional performance of normal duty will not alone justify an award of this decoration. For service not related to actual war, the term "duty of a great responsibility" applies to a narrower range of positions than in time of war and requires evidence of a conspicuously significant achievement. However, justification of the award may accrue by virtue of exceptionally meritorious service in a succession of high positions of great importance. Awards may be made to persons other than members of the Armed Forces of the United States for wartime services only, and only then under exceptional circumstances with the express approval of the president in each case.

Components
The following are authorized components of the Distinguished Service Medal and applicable specifications:
Decoration (regular size): MIL-D-3943/7.
NSN for decoration set: 8455-00-444-0007.
NSN for replacement medal is 8455-00-246-3830.
Decoration (miniature size): MIL-D-3943/7. NSN 8455-00-996-5008.
Ribbon: MIL-R-11589/52. NSN 8455-00-252-9922.
Lapel Button (metal replica of ribbon bar): MIL-L-11484/4. NSN 8455-00-253-0809.

History of the Distinguished Service Medal
The Distinguished Service Medal was authorized by Presidential Order dated January 2, 1918, and confirmed by Congress on July 9, 1918. It was announced by War Department General Order No. 6, 1918-01-12, with the following information concerning the medal: "A bronze medal of appropriate design and a ribbon to be worn in lieu thereof, to be awarded by the President to any person who, while serving in any capacity with the Army shall hereafter distinguish himself or herself, or who, since 04-06-1917, has distinguished himself or herself by exceptionally meritorious service to the Government in a duty of great responsibility in time of war or in connection with military operations against an armed enemy of the United States." The Act of Congress on July 9, 1918, recognized the need for different types and degrees of heroism and meritorious service and included such provisions for award criteria. The current statutory authorization for the Distinguished Service Medal is Title 10, United States Code, Section 3743.

Recipients

Among the first awards of the Distinguished Service Medal for service in World War I, were those to the Commanding Officers of the Allied Armies:
Marshal Ferdinand Foch
Marshal Joseph Joffre
General Philippe Petain of France
General Louis Franchet d'Espèrey of France
General Sir Arthur Currie of Canada
General Sir John Monash of Australia
Field Marshal Douglas Haig, 1st Earl Haig of Britain
General Armando Diaz of Italy
General Cyriaque Gillain of Belgium
General John Joseph Pershing of the United States
Field Marshal Živojin Mišić of Serbia

More than 2,000 awards were made during World War I, and by the time the United States entered World War II, approximately 2,800 awards had been made.  From July 1, 1941, to June 6, 1969, when the Department of the Army stopped publishing awards of the DSM in Department of the Army General Orders, over 2,800 further awards were made.

Prior to World War II the DSM was the only decoration for non-combat service in the U.S. Army.  As a result, before World War II the DSM was awarded to a wider range of recipients than during and after World War II.  During World War I awards of the DSM to officers below the rank of brigadier general were fairly common but became rare once the Legion of Merit was established in 1942.

Until the first award of the Air Force Distinguished Service Medal in 1965, United States Air Force personnel received this award as well, as was the case with several other Department of the Army decorations until the Department of the Air Force fully established its own system of decorations.

Notable recipients
Because the Army Distinguished Service Medal is principally awarded to general officers, a list of notable recipients would include nearly every general, and some admirals, since 1918, many of whom received multiple awards, as well as a few civilians and sergeants major prominent for their contributions to national defense.

General Martin Dempsey, former chairman of the Joint Chiefs of Staff, holds the record for receiving the greatest number of awards of the Army Distinguished Service Medal, at six. He also received three awards of the Defense Distinguished Service Medal as well as one award each of the Navy Distinguished Service Medal, the Air Force Distinguished Service Medal, and the Coast Guard Distinguished Service Medal, for a total of twelve Distinguished Service Medals.

Generals of the Army Douglas MacArthur and Dwight Eisenhower are tied with five awards each received of the Army Distinguished Service Medal.  They also each received one award of the Navy Distinguished Service Medal, for a total of six DSMs each.

General Lucius D. Clay (Four Star) received three Army DSM awards for his service that included Commanding General, U.S. Army Forces (European Theater) and Military Governor of Germany. During his tenure, Gen. Clay solved his greatest challenge: the Soviet Blockade of Berlin, which was imposed in June 1948. Gen. Clay triggered the Berlin Airlift, which served the city residents during the harsh winter of 1948–1949. He is also a recipient of the Legion of Merit.

General Norman Schwarzkopf received two awards of the Army DSM and one award each of the Defense DSM, Navy DSM, the Air Force DSM and the Coast Guard DSM, for a total of six DSMs.

General Lloyd Austin received four awards of the Army DSM and five awards of the Defense DSM for a total of nine DSMs.

Among notable recipients below flag rank are: X-1 test pilot Chuck Yeager and X-15 test pilot Robert M. White, who both received the DSM as U.S. Air Force majors; Air Force Major Rudolf Anderson, the U-2 pilot shot down during the Cuban Missile Crisis; director Frank Capra, decorated in 1945 as an army colonel; actor James Stewart, decorated in 1945 as an Army Air Forces colonel (later Air Force Brigadier General); Colonel Wendell Fertig, who led Filipino guerrillas behind Japanese lines; Colonel (later Major General) John K. Singlaub, who led partisan forces in the Korean War; and Major Maude C. Davison, who led the "Angels of Bataan and Corregidor" during their imprisonment by the Japanese, and Colonel William S. Taylor, Program Manager Multiple Launch Rocket System. Among notable civilian recipients are Harry L. Hopkins, Robert S. McNamara and Henry L. Stimson.

Notable American and foreign recipients include:

United States Army
General of the Armies John J. Pershing – Commander of the American Expeditionary Forces
General of the Army George C. Marshall – US Army Chief of Staff (two awards)
General of the Army Douglas MacArthur – Supreme Commander for the Allied Powers (five awards)
General of the Army Dwight D. Eisenhower – NATO Supreme Allied Commander Europe (five awards)
General of the Army Omar N. Bradley – Chairman of the Joint Chiefs of Staff (four awards)
General John Abizaid – Commander US Central Command
General Creighton Abrams – US Army Chief of Staff (five awards)
General Lloyd Austin - Commander US Central Command (four awards)
General J. H. Binford Peay III - Commander US Central Command (two awards)
General Tasker H. Bliss – US Army Chief of Staff
General George W. Casey Jr. – US Army Chief of Staff (two awards)
General Peter W. Chiarelli – US Army Vice Chief of Staff
General Mark W. Clark – Commander of the United Nations Command (four awards)
General Lucius D. Clay – Commanding General European Theater and Military Governor of Germany (three awards)
General J. Lawton Collins – US Army Chief of Staff (four awards)
General Bantz J. Craddock – Commander US European Command
General Malin Craig – US Army Chief of Staff (three awards)
General Martin E. Dempsey – Chairman of the Joint Chiefs of Staff (six awards)
General Ann E. Dunwoody – First female US Army four-star general United States Army Materiel Command (two awards)
General John W. Foss - Commander Training and Doctrine Command (three awards)
General Tommy Franks – Commander US Central Command (two awards)
General John Galvin – NATO Supreme Allied Commander Europe
General Alfred Gruenther – NATO Supreme Allied Commander Europe (four awards)
General Alexander Haig – NATO Supreme Allied Commander Europe
General Carter Ham - Commander of United States Africa Command
General John J. Hennessey – Commander United States Readiness Command
General John L. Hines – US Army Chief of Staff
General Harold K. Johnson – US Army Chief of Staff (two awards)
General George Joulwan – NATO Supreme Allied Commander Europe
General Lyman L. Lemnitzer – NATO Supreme Allied Commander Europe (four awards)
General Peyton C. March – US Army Chief of Staff
General Edward C. Meyer – US Army Chief of Staff
General Mark Milley - Chairman of the Joint Chiefs of Staff (four awards)
General Lauris Norstad – NATO Supreme Allied Commander Europe
General George S. Patton – Commander US 3rd Army (three awards)
General David Petraeus – Commander International Security Assistance Force (three awards)
General Colin Powell – Chairman of the Joint Chiefs of Staff (two awards)
General Dennis Reimer – US Army Chief of Staff
General Matthew B. Ridgeway – US Army Chief of Staff (four awards)
General Bernard W. Rogers – NATO Supreme Allied Commander Europe
General Peter Schoomaker – US Army Chief of Staff (three awards)
General Norman Schwarzkopf – Commander of Operation Desert Storm (three awards)
General John Shalikashvili – Chairman of the Joint Chiefs of Staff
General Hugh Shelton – Chairman of the Joint Chiefs of Staff (three awards)
General Eric Shinseki – US Army Chief of Staff (two awards)
General Joseph Stilwell – Commander of the China Burma India Theater
General Maxwell D. Taylor – US Army Chief of Staff
General James Van Fleet – Commander US 8th Army in Korea
General Jonathan M. Wainwright – Commander Allied Forces Philippines
General Walton Walker – Commander US 8th Army in Korea (two awards)
General William Westmoreland – US Army Chief of Staff (four awards)
General Earle G. Wheeler – Chairman of the Joint Chiefs of Staff (two awards)
Lieutenant General John B. Coulter (three awards)
Lieutenant General Harris W. Hollis - Commanding General, 9th and 25th Infantry Divisions in South Vietnam 
Lieutenant General Henry E. Emerson – Commander XVIII Airborne Corps
Lieutenant General Charles Flynn - 25th Infantry Division
Lieutenant General Mark P. Hertling – Commanding General of US Army Europe
Lieutenant General Kenneth W. Hunzeker
Lieutenant General John C. H. Lee – Commanding General Army Service Forces Europe WWII
Lieutenant General Hunter Liggett
Lieutenant General Edward J. O'Neill – with 1 bronze oak leaf cluster in lieu of subsequent award of medal
Lieutenant General Ricardo Sanchez – Commanding General V Corps (two awards)
Lieutenant General Eric Schoomaker – 42nd Surgeon General of the United States Army
Lieutenant General William Wilson Quinn – Chevalier of the French Legion of Honor
Lieutenant General Nadja West – 44th Surgeon General of the United States Army
Major General Gladeon M. Barnes – Chief of Research and Engineering
Major General Chester V. Clifton – Military Aide to Presidents Kennedy and Johnson
Major General William E. Cole – Commander 351st Field Artillery 1917-18
Major General William J. Donovan – founder of the Office of Strategic Services
Major General James L. Dozier – deputy chief of staff at NATO's Southern European land forces
Major General Lawrence J. Fuller – deputy director of the Defense Intelligence Agency
Major General Charles M. Gettys – commanding general, 23rd Infantry Division
Major General George W. Goethals – engineer of the Panama Canal
Major General William C. Gorgas – Surgeon General of the Army
Major General Patrick J. Hurley
Major General Edward Mann Lewis
Major General Henry Balding Lewis
Major General Robert McGowan Littlejohn
Major General Viet Xuan Luong – United States Army, Japan.
Major General Mason M. Patrick
Major General Maurice Rose – commanding general 3rd Armored Division
Major General John K. Singlaub
Major General Arthur R. Wilson
Major General Cedric T. Wins
Brigadier General Sherwood Cheney – chief of the Army Transport Service during World War I
Brigadier General Charles G. Dawes – Vice President of the United States
Brigadier General Anna Mae Hays – chief of the United States Army Nurse Corps and first female US Army general
Brigadier General Frank T. Hines – director of the Veterans Administration
Brigadier General Howard Knox Ramey
Brigadier General Frank Merrill
Brigadier General Greg Parker
Brigadier General Russell W. Volckmann
Colonel Frank Capra – movie director (received as a colonel, Army of the United States in WW II) 
Colonel Harvey Williams Cushing – neurosurgeon
Colonel Horatio B. Hackett – Assistant administrator of the Public Works Administration; noted architect and businessman; football official and player
Colonel Oveta Culp Hobby – director of the Women's Army Corps during World War II
Colonel Herbert H. Lehman – Governor of New York and United States Senator
Colonel Floyd James Thompson – The longest-held prisoner of war in American history
Major David A. Reed – U.S. Senator for Pennsylvania, 1922, for service as a major in World War I
Major Forsyth Wickes – socialite, philanthropist and collector
Chaplain Francis P. Duffy – chaplain of the "Fighting 69th"
Major Herbert O. Yardley – cryptologist
Sergeant Major of the Army Daniel A. Dailey
Command Sergeant Major Adam Nash

United States Navy
Fleet Admiral Chester W. Nimitz – Chief of Naval Operations
Fleet Admiral William F. Halsey – Commander of the 3rd Fleet
Admiral William S. Benson - Chief of Naval Operations
Admiral William J. Crowe, Jr. – Chairman of the Joint Chiefs of Staff
Admiral William Fechteler - Chief of Naval Operations
Admiral Albert Gleaves - Commander of the Asiatic Fleet
Admiral Jonathan Greenert - Chief of Naval Operations
Admiral Thomas C. Kinkaid - Commander Sixteenth Fleet
Admiral William V. Pratt - Chief of Naval Operations
Admiral U. S. Grant Sharp Jr. - Commander US Pacific Command
Admiral Raymond A. Spruance – Commander of the 5th Fleet (later Ambassador to the Philippines)
Admiral Harold Rainsford Stark - Chief of Naval Operations
Admiral Carlisle Trost – Chief of Naval Operations
Admiral Henry B. Wilson - Commander of the Atlantic Fleet
Vice Admiral Robert L. Ghormley
Vice Admiral Henry Kent Hewitt (with oak leaf cluster)
Rear Admiral Hilary P. Jones
Rear Admiral Charles P. Plunkett

United States Marine Corps
General Paul X. Kelley
General Vernon E. Megee,
General Peter Pace – Chairman of the Joint Chiefs of Staff
Major General Graves B. Erskine
Major General Smedley Butler
Major General John A. Lejeune

United States Air Force
Note – includes Army Air Service, Army Air Corps and Army Air Forces

General of the Air Force Hap Arnold – commander of the Army Air Forces
General Jimmy Doolittle
General Edwin W. Rawlings
General Joseph McNarney
General Hoyt S. Vandenberg – Air Force Chief of Staff and Director of Central Intelligence
General George C. Kenney
General Curtis Lemay – Air Force Chief of Staff
General Carl Spaatz – Air Force Chief of Staff
General Michael E. Ryan
Lieutenant General Claire Lee Chennault (with oak leaf cluster) – Leader of the Flying Tigers
Major General Billy Mitchell, USAAC – Military air power prophet
Brigadier General Chuck Yeager – Legendary test pilot
Colonel Bernt Balchen, USAF – Legendary Norwegian-American pilot and arctic explorer.
Captain John Birch, USAAF – Missionary, guerilla leader and namesake of the John Birch Society
Brigadier General Darr H. Alkire

Civilians
Grace Banker – chief telephone operator of mobile for the American Expeditionary Forces
Bernard Baruch – chairman, War Industries Board, 1918
Evangeline Booth – General of the Salvation Army
Jacqueline Cochran – Aviator and founder of the Women Airforce Service Pilots (WASPs)
Henry Pomeroy Davison – director of the American Red Cross
Jane Delano – Founder of the American Red Cross Nursing Service
James Forrestal - Secretary of Defense
Harry Augustus Garfield – U.S. Fuel Administrator
Harry Hopkins – Presidential aide
Edward N. Hurley – chairman, American Shipping Board
Robert McNamara – Secretary of Defense
Hannah J. Patterson – resident director of the Women's Committee of the Council of National Defense
Anna Howard Shaw – head of the Women's Committee of the Council of National Defense
Edward R. Stettinius – director general of purchases for the War Department
John F. Stevens –  Engineer of the Panama Canal and the Great Northern Railway
Henry L. Stimson – Secretary of War

Foreigners
Edmund Allenby, 1st Viscount Allenby, General (later Field Marshal), British Army
HM Albert I, King of Belgians
Alan Brooke, 1st Viscount Alanbrooke, field marshal, British Army
Pietro Badoglio, general, Italian Army
William Birdwood, 1st Baron Birdwood, general, British Indian Army (during secondment to Australian Army, later promoted to Field Marshal)
Julian Byng, 1st Viscount Byng of Vimy, General (later Field Marshal), British Army
Sir Winston Churchill KG, OM, PC, CH, FRS – British Minister of Munitions (later Prime Minister)
Harry Crerar, lieutenant general, Canadian Army
Andrew Cunningham, 1st Viscount Cunningham of Hyndhope, Admiral of the Fleet, Royal Navy
Sir Arthur Currie, lieutenant general, British Army, commanding Canadian Corps
Georges de Bazelaire, major general, VII Army Corps of the French Army during World War I
Sir Francis de Guingand, major general, British Army
Jean de Lattre de Tassigny, general, French Army (later a Marshal of France)
Sir Miles Dempsey, general, British Army
Sir John Dill, field marshal, British Army
Ferdinand Foch, Marshal of France, French Army
Douglas Haig, 1st Earl Haig, field marshal, British Army
Arthur T. Harris, air chief marshal, Royal Air Force (later a Marshal of the Royal Air Force)
Chiang Kai-shek, general, Chinese Army
Charles Mangin, general, French Army
Paul Maistre, general, French Army
Sir Richard McCreery, general, British Army
Lord Alfred Milner, British Secretary of State for War
Živojin Mišić, field marshal, Serbian Army
Sir John Monash, general, Australian Army
Bernard Montgomery, 1st Viscount Montgomery of Alamein, field marshal, British Army
Sir Frederick E. Morgan, lieutenant general, British Army
Louis Mountbatten, 1st Earl Mountbatten of Burma, admiral, Royal Navy (later Admiral of the Fleet)
Henri Petain, Marshal of France, French Army
Alexander Pokryshkin, Marshal of the Soviet Air Force
Charles Portal, 1st Viscount Portal of Hungerford, Marshal of the Royal Air Force
Sir William Robertson, 1st Baronet, field marshal, British Army
Frederick Sykes, Chief of the Air Staff (United Kingdom)
Arthur Tedder, 1st Baron Tedder, air chief marshal, Royal Air Force (later Marshal of the Royal Air Force)
Sir Henry Worth Thornton, major general, British Army (American-born)
Gerald Trotter, brigadier-general, British Army
Sir Thomas Montgomery-Cuninghame, 10th Baronet of Corsehill, brevet lieutenant colonel, military attache, British Army
Maxime Weygand, general, French Army

See also
Navy Distinguished Service Medal
Air Force Distinguished Service Medal
Awards and decorations of the United States military
Awards and decorations of the United States Army

References

External links

 Department of the Army Regulation 600-8-22; Military Awards; 2006-12-11; Effective date: 2007-01-11.
Department of the Army Regulation 670-1; Wear and Appearance of Army Uniforms and Insignia; 2005-02-03; Effective date: 2005-03-03.
US Army Institute of Heraldry: Distinguished Service Medal
Distinguished Service Medal - Criteria, Background, and Images 
Noteworthy NCOs
Congressional Medal of Honor, Distinguished Service Cross, and Distinguished Service Medal Issued by The War Department 1919

Awards and decorations of the United States Army

Awards established in 1918